Nadozerye is a rural locality (a village) in Morzhegorskoye Rural Settlement of Vinogradovsky District, Arkhangelsk Oblast, Russia. The population was 11 as of 2010.

Geography 
It is located on the Talto Lake, 25 km northwest of Bereznik (the district's administrative centre) by road. Uyta is the nearest rural locality.

References 

Rural localities in Vinogradovsky District